Kleidonia is a village and a community in the municipality of Konitsa, Ioannina regional unit, Epirus, Greece. In 2011 its population was 11 for the village, and 136 for the community, which includes the village Kalyvia. The Greek National Road 20 (Ioannina - Konitsa - Kozani) passes through Kalyvia. It is situated on the right bank of the river Voidomatis, a tributary of the Aoos.

Population

History
Two prehistoric locations have been found near Kleidonia:
Kleidi Cave
Megalakkos Cave

In these two caves there are archaeological remains that date back to 20,000 and 12,000 years ago, in the later period of the Paleolithic Era in Greece.

See also

List of settlements in the Ioannina regional unit

External links
Kleidonia at the GTP Travel Pages

References

Populated places in Ioannina (regional unit)